Ludmila of Bohemia (c. 860 – 15 September 921) is a Czech saint and martyr venerated by the Orthodox and the Roman Catholics. She was born in Mělník as the daughter of the Sorbian prince Slavibor. Saint Ludmila was the grandmother of Saint Wenceslaus, who is widely referred to as Good King Wenceslaus. Saint Ludmila was canonized shortly after her death. As part of the process of canonization, in 925, Wenceslaus moved her remains to St. George's Basilica, Prague.

Marriage
Ludmila was married to Bořivoj I of Bohemia, the first Christian Duke of Bohemia, in 873. The couple converted to Christianity through the efforts of Methodius. Their efforts to convert Bohemia to Christianity were initially not well received, and pagans drove them from their country for a time.  Eventually the couple returned and ruled for several years before retiring to Tetín, near Beroun.

Bořivoj was succeeded by their son Spytihněv. Spytihněv was succeeded by his brother Vratislav. When Vratislav died in 921, his son Wenceslas became the next ruler of Bohemia. It had been primarily Ludmila who raised her grandson, and she acted as regent for him.

Ludmila and Drahomíra

Wenceslaus' mother, Drahomíra, became jealous of Ludmila's influence over Wenceslaus. She had two noblemen, Tunna and Gommon (probably of Frankish or Varangian descent) murder Ludmila in Tetín, and part of Ludmila's narrative states that she was strangled with her veil. Initially, Ludmila was buried at St. Michael's at Tetín.

Ludmila was canonized shortly after her death. As part of the process of canonization, in 925 Wenceslaus moved her remains to St. George's Basilica, Prague. She is venerated as a patroness of Bohemia. She is considered to be a patron saint of Bohemia, converts, duchesses, those with problems with in-laws, and widows. Her feast day is celebrated on September 16th.

Antonín Dvořák composed his oratorio Saint Ludmila between September 1885 and May 1886. The work was commissioned by the publisher Littleton for the Leeds Festival.

See also
St. George's Basilica, Prague
House of Přemysl
Bohemia
 Statue of Saint Ludmila, Charles Bridge
 Saint Ludmila, patron saint archive

References

Sources
 Pekar, J., Die Wenzels- und Ludmilla-Legenden und die Echtheit Christians (Prag, 1906).
 Christianus Monachus, "Vita et Passio sancti Venceslai et sanctae Ludmilae avae eius," in  Magnae Moraviae Fontes Historici (Brno, 1967), 186–199.
 Ingham, N. W., "The Lost Church Slavonic Life of Saint Ludmila," in Studia Slavica Mediaevalia et Himanistica. Riccardo Piccio dicata. T. 1-2 (Roma, 1986), 349–360.

860s births
921 deaths
Year of birth uncertain
Converts to Christianity from pagan religions
Early Sorbian people
Czech Roman Catholic saints
Czech murder victims
Duchesses of Bohemia
Roman Catholic royal saints
Christian female saints of the Middle Ages
9th-century women
9th-century Bohemian people
10th-century Christian saints
10th-century Christian martyrs
10th-century women rulers
Burials at St. George's Basilica, Prague